WMSA (1340 AM) is a commercial radio station broadcasting a radio format of talk and oldies, with local news updates. Licensed to Massena, New York, the station is owned by the Stephens Media Group.

WMSA transmits with 910 watts around the clock. It uses a non-directional antenna.

History
WMSA is one of the oldest stations in the North Country.

The station was previously owned by Martz Communications Group, and was acquired by Stephens as of February 1, 2008.

Translators
A translator, W225DE (92.9 Massena), was turned on in late July 2021.

External links
www.1340wmsa.com

MSA
Oldies radio stations in the United States
Radio stations established in 1945
1945 establishments in New York (state)